Underground Vol. 16: For da Summa is the first solo album by American hip hop musician DJ Paul. It was released on May 21, 2002, through D'Evil/KOM Music with distribution via Hypnotize Minds. Recording sessions took place at Hypnotize Minds Studio and D.J. Paul's Mama House in Memphis. Production was handled entirely by DJ Paul, who also served as executive producer. It features guest appearances from fellow Prophet Posse/Hypnotize Camp Posse members Lord Infamous, Frayser Boy, Crunchy Black, La Chat, Juicy J and Project Pat. Chopped and screwed version of the album was remixed by DJ Black.

The album peaked at number 127 on the Billboard 200, number 24 Top R&B/Hip-Hop Albums, number 7 on the Independent Albums and number 2 on the Heatseekers Albums. The original masters of the originally recorded '94 album, Volume 16: 4 da Summer of '94, was released in 2013 and peaked at number 39 on the Heatseekers Albums.

The album's sequel, Underground Vol. 17: For da Summa, was released in 2017.

Track listing

Chart history

References

External links

DJ Paul albums
2002 debut albums
Albums produced by DJ Paul